Pelle flyttar till Komfusenbo is a 1990 Swedish film directed by Johanna Hald and based on the novel of the same name by Astrid Lindgren.

Plot 
Pelle is angry. His father does not find his pen and suspects that Pelle has taken it. Pelle actually took it, but he put it back in his father's coat pocket. He feels wronged and decides to move out. Later he packs his things and wants to move into the little house in the garden. He also wants to spend Christmas there. When he talks to his mother, she convinces him to move into the house again. There Pelle is lighting the candles. When his father comes home from work, he hugs Pelle. Furthermore, Pelle's father apologises to Pelle, as he has found his pen.

Cast
 Mattias Johansson: Pelle 
 Lena Endre: Mother
 Krister Henriksson: Father

Background 
Pelle flyttar till Komfusenbo was first broadcast in 1990 in Sweden. Later it was also shown on German television. After that, it was released on DVD in both Sweden and Germany.

Reception

Critical response
According to Filmtipset.se Pelle flyttar till Komfusenbo is a cute short film with good actors, but not much more.

External links

References

Swedish children's films
1990s Swedish-language films
1990 films
Films based on works by Astrid Lindgren
Films directed by Johanna Hald
Swedish short films
1990s Swedish films